The Vote for Change tour was a politically motivated American popular music concert tour that took place in October 2004. The tour was presented by MoveOn.org to benefit America Coming Together. The tour was held in swing states and was designed to encourage people to register and vote. Though the tour and the organization were officially non-partisan, many of the performers urged people to vote against then President George W. Bush and for John Kerry in the 2004 Presidential election campaign. Bush would defeat Kerry in November 2004.

Itinerary
Every region had a specific night during which the concerts would be held in that region. When concerts were held in the same city, they were at different venues.

Results
The tour was generally successful in attracting audiences, generating media attention and raising approximately $10 million for America Coming Together.

In terms of the tour's effect on the 2004 election, none of the visited states went differently from what had been predicted in pre-election polls.  Four of the eight ended up voting in favor of Kerry (Pennsylvania, Michigan, Minnesota, and Wisconsin) while the other four went to Bush (Missouri, Iowa, Florida, and Ohio).  The states that had the heaviest tour presence (five or six shows) also split evenly.  The result in Ohio was the most critical, as it decided the election in Bush's favor (despite six shows there).

The shows
The Springsteen and E Street Band performances were compressed to two hours in length due to the multi-act nature of the concerts. Especially at the beginning of his sets, Springsteen accomplished this by stripping down the songs, removing elongated outros and false endings from the likes of "Born in the U.S.A." and "Badlands". In doing so, the style of the Vote for Change shows foreshadowed the next E Street outing, the 2007 Magic Tour, when Springsteen adopted a similar approach.

Tour dates

Performers

References

External links
Backstreets.com set lists and descriptions for the shows that Springsteen was involved in

2004 concert tours
Bruce Springsteen concert tours
The Chicks concert tours
Musical advocacy groups
Pearl Jam concert tours
2004 United States presidential election in popular culture
R.E.M. concert tours